The Moth is a 1934 American crime drama film directed by Fred C. Newmeyer about an irresponsible, disinherited heiress called Diane who heads for New Orleans and crosses paths with a jewel thief who is a notorious criminal known as The Moth.

Cast
Sally O'Neil as Diana Wyman 
Paul Page as George Duncan 
Wilfred Lucas as John Gale 
Fred Kelsey as Detective Blake 
Duncan Renaldo as Don Pedro 
Rae Daggett as Marie LeMaire, The Moth
Nina Guilbert as Auntie Jane Stevens
Georgia O'Dell as Old Maid Train Passenger
Jack Cheatham as 1st Desk Sergeant (uncredited)

References

External links

1934 films
American black-and-white films
1934 crime drama films
American crime drama films
Films directed by Fred C. Newmeyer
1930s English-language films
1930s American films